BFS Blue Enterprises is a Spanish-owned firm whose multi-patented, microalgae-based technology uses  emissions to produce crude oil together with biotech & pharmaceutical products. It was formed in 2006 in eastern Spain after three years of research by scientists and engineers connected with the University of Alicante. Currently, an industrial pilot plant is known to have proven to produce standardized products, while utilizing and neutralizing  emissions. Their system of bioconversion is said to be more productive than any other plant-based system producing oil or ethanol.

Founders 
One of the founders is to be Bernard StroÏazzo Mougin.

See also
 Algal fuel
 Biofuel
 Biopetroleum
 Bioplastic

References

External links
 International Congress "Bio-mass and biofuels production from algae oil" : Airemar prototype.

Sources

Renewable energy companies of Spain
Algal fuel producers